Clavisybra strandiella is a species of beetle in the family Cerambycidae, and the only species in the genus Clavisybra. It was described by Breuning in 1943.

References

Apomecynini
Beetles described in 1943
Monotypic Cerambycidae genera